Neil Boobyer (born 11 June 1972) is a former Wales international rugby union player. A centre, he played his club rugby for Llanelli and was part of the Wales squad for the 1999 Rugby World Cup.

He made his debut for Wales 22 May 1993 versus Zimbabwe.

References

1972 births
Living people
Llanelli RFC players
Rugby union players from Bridgend
Wales international rugby union players
Welsh rugby union players
Rugby union centres